Rizos is a surname of Greek origin. People with the surname include:

Dimitris Rizos (architect) (fl. 1990s–2000s), Greek-born architect
Giannis Rizos (born 2002), Greek footballer
Iakovos Rizos (1849–1926), Greek painter
Iason Rizos (1923-1996), Greek architect 
Nikos Rizos (1924–1999), Greek actor

See also
Rizo, Spanish surname

Surnames of Greek origin